Simon Roduner (born 20 October 1984) is a former Swiss professional footballer. From 2014 until 2018 he coached the team of SV Höngg. Under him the team got promoted into the 1st league in Sommer 2017. In July 2018 he became the head coach of FC Red Star Zurich.

External links

1984 births
Living people
Swiss men's footballers
Association football midfielders
FC Wohlen players
FC St. Gallen players
Swiss Super League players
Footballers from Zürich